Eshman may refer to:

Places
 Eshman-e Dehgah
 Eshman-e Kamachal

People
 Keith Eshman, Australian rugby league footballer

See also
Eshmanan, a term used in Kerala (south India) to refer to a feudal landlord